Filippa Möörk (born 14 May 1997) is a Swedish professional golfer. She won the 2018 Swedish Golf Tour Order of Merit and joined the Ladies European Tour in 2019.

Amateur career
Möörk enjoyed a prolific amateur career as a junior and won the Skandia Cup Riksfinal in 2010 and 2013, the Sotenäs Junior Open and Nina Reis Junior Open in 2012 and the Skandia Junior Open Girls in 2014, crowning her junior career by winning the Swedish Junior Strokeplay Championship in 2015.

Representing her National Team, she won a silver medal in the 2014 European Girls' Team Championship and a bronze medal in the 2017 European Ladies' Team Championship. 

In 2014, she won a silver medal in the World Junior Girls Championship at Angus Glen Golf Club in Ontario, Canada, together with Emma Svensson and Michaela Finn. The following year, she won a bronze medal in the same tournament with Elin Esborn and Frida Kinhult, as well as an individual bronze medal.

Möörk attended the University of Miami in 2016–17 to study business and play golf with the Miami Hurricanes, but dropped out after a year to turn professional. While still an amateur, in 2017, Möörk won a professional event on the Swedish Golf Tour, the Flommen Ladies Open.

Professional career
Möörk turned professional in late 2017 and joined the Swedish Golf Tour. In 2018, she finished third at SM Match Play, was runner-up in the Skaftö Open and Johannesberg Open, and won the Tegelberga Open, helping her secure the 2018 Order of Merit title.

In 2019, Möörk joined the Ladies European Tour after finishing T7 at Q-School, and played in 14 events making nine cuts. Her best finishes were T12 in the Jabra Ladies Open and T13 in the Lalla Meryem Cup. She finished her rookie season 72nd on the Order of Merit.

Amateur wins (12)
2010 (4) Skandia Cup Riksfinal F13, Skandia Tour Riks #1 Värmland, Skandia Tour Regional #3 Värmland, DM Damer Värmland
2012 (4) Sotenäs Junior Open, Nina Reis Junior Open, Skandia Tour Riks #4 Småland, Skandia Tour Riks #5 Värmland
2013 (1) Skandia Cup Riksfinal F16
2014 (1) Skandia Junior Open Girls
2015 (2) Skandia Tour Elit Flickor #5, Swedish Junior Strokeplay Championship

Sources:

Professional wins (3)

Swedish Golf Tour wins (3)

Source:

Team appearances
Amateur
European Girls' Team Championship (representing Sweden): 2014
World Junior Girls Championship (representing Sweden): 2014, 2015
European Ladies' Team Championship (representing Sweden): 2017

References

External links

Swedish female golfers
Miami Hurricanes women's golfers
Ladies European Tour golfers
Sportspeople from Karlstad
People from Sunne Municipality
1997 births
Living people